Oleksandr Olehovych Kemkin (born 5 August 2002) is a Ukrainian professional footballer who plays as a goalkeeper for Mynai.

Career
Born in Melitopol, Kemkin is a product of the neighbouring Metalurh Zaporizhzhia and also Shakhtar Donetsk youth sportive school systems and in July 2021 he signed a contract with Ukrainian side Mynai and played for its in the Ukrainian Premier League Reserves and Under 19 Championship. 

Lately Kemkin was promoted to the senior squad of this team. He made his debut in the Ukrainian Premier League for Mynai as a second half-time last minutes substituted player on 12 September 2022, playing in a winning away match against Inhulets Petrove.

References

External links
 
 

2002 births
Living people
People from Melitopol
Ukrainian footballers
Association football goalkeepers
FC Shakhtar Donetsk players
FC Mynai players
Ukrainian Premier League players